Milam Stadium located in Weatherford, Oklahoma is the home stadium of the NCAA Division II college football team the Bulldogs of Southwestern Oklahoma State University (SWOSU). The stadium boasts a seating capacity of 8,600. The stadium opened in 1936 and is named for, Joe Milam, a former Bulldog coach.

Milam Stadium hosted the 1996 NAIA Division I football season championship game against Montana Tech.

References

College football venues
Southwestern Oklahoma State Bulldogs football
Buildings and structures in Custer County, Oklahoma
American football venues in Oklahoma
1936 establishments in Oklahoma